The Runaways (Broadway, 1903), originally Chow Chow (Chicago, 1902), was an American comedy musical with book and lyrics by Addison Burkhardt and music by Raymond Hubbell. The show was joined by Fay Templeton when it came to Broadway.

References

External links

 

1903 musicals